Nadar Mahajana Sangam S. Vellaichamy Nadar College (also known as SVN College) is an educational institution located at Nagamalai, Madurai, Tamil Nadu, India. It was started in 1965 by Nadar Mahajana Sangam and offers bachelors and master's level degrees.  The college is affiliated with Madurai Kamaraj University.  It is a co-educational, autonomous and ISO 9001:2008 certified institution and was re-accredited as "A" grade by the National Assessment and Accreditation Council (NAAC), Bangalore on 10 March 2012.

History 
The college was started in 1965 by Nadar Mahajana Sangam with donations received from members of the Sangam. A sum of ₹ one lakh was donated by S. Vellaichamy Nadar.  The college started as a pre-university college with an initial student strength of 330 (boys only), 18 teachers and 12 non-teaching staff.  It was inaugurated on 20 July 1965 by K. Kamaraj.

In 1986, it became a co-educational institution and, in 2007, became autonomous.  It is now a post-graduate research institution aiming at imparting quality education with main emphasis on conduct and character development.

In 1990, the college celebrated its silver jubilee function in the presence of Surjith Singh Barnala, the then-governor of Tamil Nadu. A number of eminent persons visited the college including former union minister Mohan Kumaramangalam, George Fernandes, former chief minister M. Karunanidhi.

Courses offered 
The campus consists of separate blocks accommodating 14 aided courses and 24 self-finance courses including AICTE-approved MBA programme.

Placements 
Personality development programs are regularly conducted for the final year students to make them employable. Placement Cell has also arranging Industrial visit, Guest lectures for the students to get and idea about the placement.

Student organizations 

Lectures, debates, discussions, quiz, essay, elocution and several competitions are held under the auspices of the department associations so as to nurture the students in their respective fields of study. Students are encouraged to participate in competitions arranged in neighbour colleges and by other local organizations. Intercollegiate seminars are periodically organized by each department.

A college magazine named Vaanam (வானம்) is published in order to develop writing skills among students.

See also 
 List of Colleges in Madurai
list of colleges in  tuticorin

References 

Colleges in Madurai
Universities and colleges in Madurai
Educational institutions established in 1965
1965 establishments in Madras State
Colleges affiliated to Madurai Kamaraj University